Events in the year 1977 in the Republic of India.

Incumbents
 President of India – Fakhruddin Ali Ahmed until 11 February, Neelam Sanjiva Reddy.
 Prime Minister of India – Indira Gandhi until 24 March, Morarji Desai.
 Chief Justice of India – Ajit Nath Ray (until 27 January), Mirza Hameedullah Beg (starting 27 January)

Governors
 Andhra Pradesh – 
 until 17 February: Ramchandra Dhondiba Bhandare
 17 February-5 May: B. J. Divan 
 starting 5 May: Sharda Mukherjee
 Assam – L. P. Singh 
 Bihar – Jagannath Kaushal 
 Gujarat – Kambanthodath Kunhan Vishwanatham 
 Haryana – Jaisukh Lal Hathi (until 23 September), Harcharan Singh Brar (starting 23 September)
 Himachal Pradesh – S. Chakravarti (until 16 February), Amin ud-din Ahmad Khan (starting 16 February)
 Jammu and Kashmir – L. K. Jha 
 Karnataka – Uma Shankar Dikshit (until 2 August), Govind Narain (starting 2 August)
 Kerala – N. N. Wanchoo (until 10 October), Jothi Venkatachalam (starting 10 October)
 Madhya Pradesh – Satya Narayan Sinha (until 13 October), N. N. Wanchu (starting 13 October)
 Maharashtra – vacant thereafter (until )
 Manipur – L.P. Singh 
 Meghalaya – L.P. Singh 
 Nagaland – L.P. Singh 
 Odisha – 
 until 7 February: Shiva Narayan Shankar 
 7 February-22 September: Harcharan Singh Brar 
 starting 22 September: Bhagwat Dayal Sharma
 Punjab – 
 until 1 September: Mahendra Mohan Choudhry 
 1 September-24 September: Ranjit Singh Narula
 starting 24 September: Jaisukh Lal Hathi
 Rajasthan – 
 until 15 February: Sardar Jogendra Singh
 15 February-17 May: Vedpal Tyagi
 starting 17 May: Raghukul Tilak
 Sikkim – B. B. Lal 
 Tamil Nadu – 
 until 8 April: Mohan Lal Sukhadia
 9 April-26 April: P. Govindan Nair
 starting 26 April: Prabhudas Patwari
 Tripura – L. P. Singh 
 Uttar Pradesh – Marri Chenna Reddy (until 1 October), Ganpatrao Devji Tapase (starting 1 October)
 West Bengal – Anthony Lancelot Dias

Events
 National income - 1,040,235 million
 18 January - Prime Minister Indira Gandhi, via a radio broadcast, announced that the Lok Sabha would be dissolved and fresh elections would be held in March.
 3 March – Nehru Planetarium commissioned.
 24 March – The first non-Congress government sweeps to power following Indira Gandhi's defeat at the general elections. Morarji Desai becomes prime minister.
 25 March - T. V. Eachara Warrier filed Habeas corpus before Kerala High Court for knowing whereabouts of his son in connection with Rajan case.
 27 May - 11 villagers of Belchi, Bihar (includes 8 Dalits and 3 Sunar) were brutally murdered by terror gang from Kurmi/Bhumihar caste as part of caste violence.
 30 June - M. G. Ramachandran sworn in as Chief Minister of Tamil Nadu. He became the first film actor to be the Chief Minister of an Indian state. 
 7 July – George Fernandes became Minister of Industries in Morarji Desai ministry. 
 20 November – More than 10,000 people die when the 1977 Andhra Pradesh cyclone hits India's southeast coast. The storm disrupts life for 5.4 million people in 830 villages, and damages 14,000 km2 of cropland.

Law
 21 March - Emergency was officially withdrawn.

Births
14 January – Narain Karthikeyan, motor racing driver
27 January – Deepshikha Nagpal, actress
31 January – Suchitra Singh, cricketer
5 February – Darez Ahamed, IAS
16 February – Darshan Thoogudeep, actor and film producer
21 February – Ranjith, singer and composer
15 March – Sandeep Unnikrishnan, Armed force officer (d. 2008).
4 April – Shamshuddin Ibrahim, model and actor
19 April – Anju Bobby George, athlete
24 May – Jeet Gannguli, singer, music director and score composer
25 May – Karthik Sivakumar, actor
19 June – Smita Sabharwal, Indian Administrative Service Officer
2 July – Ganesh, actor.
12 August  Siva, film director.
19 August  Suvaluxmi, actress.
27 August  Soori, actor and comedian.
29 August – Vishal Krishna, actor and film producer
29 August – P. V. Midhun Reddy, politician and former member of parliament from Rajampet
18 October – Kunal Kapoor, actor.
19 November  Arun Vijay, actor.
24 November – Dilip Tirkey, field hockey player
20 December – Gauri Karnik, actress

Full date unknown
Rajorshi Chakraborti, novelist.
Vasundhara Das, actress and singer.

Deaths
11 February – Fakhruddin Ali Ahmed, fifth President of India (b. 1905)
22 March – A. K. Gopalan, communist leader (b. 1904).
14 November – A. C. Bhaktivedanta Swami Prabhupada, founder–acharya of the International Society for Krishna Consciousness (b. 1896).

Full date unknown
Hamid Dalwai, social reformer and writer (b. 1932).
Abdul Majid Daryabadi, Muslim writer and exegete of the Qur'an (b. 1892).

See also 
 Bollywood films of 1977

References

 
India
Years of the 20th century in India